Solar power accounted for an estimated 8.2 per cent of electricity in Germany in 2019, which was almost exclusively from photovoltaics (PV).
About 1.5 million photovoltaic systems were installed around the country in 2014, ranging from small rooftop systems, to medium commercial and large utility-scale solar parks. Germany's largest solar farms are located in Meuro, Neuhardenberg, and Templin with capacities over 100 MW.

Germany has been among the world's top PV installer for several years, with total installed capacity amounting to 41.3 gigawatts (GW) by the end of 2016, behind only China.
However, new installations of PV systems have declined steadily since the record year of 2011. 

It's estimated that by 2017 over 70% of the country's jobs in the solar industry have been lost in the solar sector in recent years. Proponents from the PV industry blame the lack of governmental commitment, while others point out the financial burden associated with the fast-paced roll-out of photovoltaics, rendering the transition to renewable energies unsustainable in their view.

Germany's official governmental goal is to continuously increase renewables' contribution to the country's overall electricity consumption. Long-term minimum targets are 35% by 2020, 50% by 2030 and 80% by 2050. 
The country is increasingly producing more electricity at specific times with high solar irradiation than it needs, driving down spot-market prices and exporting its surplus of electricity to its neighbouring countries, with a record exported surplus of 34 TWh in 2014. 
A decline in spot-prices may however raise the electricity prices for retail customers, as the spread of the guaranteed feed-in tariff and spot-price increases as well. 
As the combined share of fluctuating wind and solar is approaching 17 per cent on the national electricity mix , other issues are becoming more pressing and others more feasible. These include adapting the electrical grid, constructing new grid-storage capacity, dismantling and altering fossil and nuclear power plantsbrown coal and nuclear power are the country's cheapest suppliers of electricity, according to today's calculationsand to construct a new generation of combined heat and power plants.

Concentrated solar power (CSP), a solar power technology that does not use photovoltaics, has virtually no significance for Germany, as this technology demands much higher solar insolation. There is, however, a 1.5MW experimental CSP-plant used for on-site engineering purposes rather than for commercial electricity generation, the Jülich Solar Tower owned by the German Aerospace Center.

History

Germany was one of the first countries to deploy grid-scale PV power. 
In 2004, Germany was the first country, together with Japan, to reach 1 GW of cumulative installed PV capacity.
Since 2004 solar power in Germany has been growing considerably due to the country's feed-in tariffs for renewable energy, which were introduced by the German Renewable Energy Sources Act, and declining PV costs.

Prices of PV systems/solar power system decreased more than 50% in the 5 years since 2006. 
By 2011, solar PV provided 18 TWh of Germany's electricity, or about 3% of the total. 
That year the federal government set a target of 66 GW of installed solar PV capacity by 2030,
to be reached with an annual increase of 2.5–3.5 GW, and a goal of 80% of electricity from renewable sources by 2050.

More than 7 GW of PV capacity were installed annually during the record years of 2010, 2011 and 2012. 
For this period, the installed capacity of 22.5 GW represented almost 30% of the worldwide deployed photovoltaics.

Since 2013, the number of new installations declined significantly due to more restrictive governmental policies.

Governmental policies 

, the feed-in tariff (FiT) costs about €14 billion (US$18 billion) per year for wind and solar installations. 
The cost is spread across all rate-payers in a surcharge of 3.6 €ct (4.6 ¢) per kWh (approximately 15% of the total domestic cost of electricity). 
On the other hand, as expensive peak power plants are displaced, the price at the power exchange is reduced due to the so-called merit order effect.
Germany set a world record for solar power production with 25.8 GW produced at midday on 20 and 21 April 2015.

According to the solar power industry, a feed-in tariff is the most effective means of developing solar power. It is the same as a power purchase agreement, but is at a much higher rate. As the industry matures, it is reduced and becomes the same as a power purchase agreement. A feed-in tariff allows investors a guaranteed return on investment a requirement for development. A primary difference between a tax credit and a feed-in tariff is that the cost is borne the year of installation with a tax credit, and is spread out over many years with a feed-in tariff. In both cases the incentive cost is distributed over all consumers. This means that the initial cost is very low for a feed-in tariff and very high for a tax credit. In both cases the learning curve reduces the cost of installation, but is not a large contribution to growth, as grid parity is still always reached.

Since the end of the boom period, national PV market has since declined significantly, due to the amendments in the German Renewable Energy Sources Act (EEG) that reduced feed-in tariffs and set constraints on utility-scaled installations, limiting their size to no more than 10 kW.

The previous version of the EEG only guaranteed financial assistance as long as the PV capacity had not yet reached 52 GW. This limit has now been removed. It also foresees to regulate annual PV growth within a range of 2.5 GW to 3.5 GW by adjusting the guaranteed fees accordingly. The legislative reforms stipulates a 40 to 45 per cent share from renewable energy sources by 2025 and a 55 to 60 per cent share by 2035.

, tenants in North Rhine-Westphalia (NRW) will soon be able to benefit from the PV panels mounted on the buildings in which they live.
The state government has introduced measures covering the self-consumption of power, allowing tenants to acquire the electricity generated onsite more cheaply than their regular utility contracts stipulate.

Grid capacity and stability issues 

In 2017, approximately 9 GW of photovoltaic plants in Germany were being retrofitted to shut down if the frequency increases to 50.2 Hz, indicating an excess of electricity on the grid. The frequency is unlikely to reach 50.2 Hz during normal operation, but can if Germany is exporting power to countries that suddenly experience a power failure. This leads to a surplus of generation in Germany, that is transferred to rotating load and generation, which causes system frequency to rise. This happened in 2003 and 2006.

However, power failures could not have been caused by photovoltaics in 2006, as solar PV played a negligible role in the German energy mix at that time. In December 2012, the president of Germany's "Bundesnetzagentur", the Federal Network Agency, stated that there is "no indication", that the switch to renewables is causing more power outages. Amory Lovins from the Rocky Mountain Institute wrote about the German Energiewende in 2013, calling the discussion about grid stability a "disinformation campaign".

Potential 

Germany has about the same solar potential as Alaska, which has an average of 3.08 sun hours/day in Fairbanks.

Bremen Sun Hours/day (Avg = 2.92 hrs/day)
Stuttgart Sun Hours/day (Avg = 3.33 hrs/day)
Source: NREL, based on an average of 30 years of weather data.

Statistics 

The history of Germany's installed photovoltaic capacity, its average power output, produced electricity, and its share in the overall consumed electricity, showed a steady, exponential growth for more than two decades up to about 2012.  
Solar PV capacity doubled on average every 18 months in this period; an annual growth rate of more than 50 per cent. 
Since about 2012 growth has slowed down significantly.

Generation

Solar PV by type  

Systems of less than 10 kW accounted for 14.2% of totalled installed capacity. These are single direct use systems, mostly residential solar pv systems. Systems rated 10–100 kW represented 38.2% of capacity and represents systems used collectively within one place such as a large residential block or large commercial premise or intensive agricultural units. The next class size of systems 100–500 kW represented 14.1% of capacity and would typically be larger commercial centres, hospitals, schools or industrial / agricultural premises or smaller ground mounted systems. The final category of systems rated over 500 kW accounted for 33.5% and mostly represent district power systems, ground mounted panels providing power to perhaps a mix of industrial and commercial sites. It is interesting to note that whilst large power plants receive a lot of attention in solar power articles, installations under 0.5 MW in size actually represent nearly two-thirds of the installed capacity in Germany in 2017.

PV capacity by federal states 

The southern states of Bavaria and Baden-Württemberg account for about half of the total, nationwide PV deployment and are also the wealthiest and most populous states after North Rhine-Westphalia. However, photovoltaic installations are widespread throughout the sixteen states and are not limited to the southern region of the country as demonstrated by a watts per capita distribution.

Photovoltaic power stations

Gallery

Companies 
Some companies have collapsed since 2008, facing harsh competition from imported solar panels. Some were taken over like Bosch Solar Energy by SolarWorld. Major German solar companies include:

 Aleo Solar
 Bosch Solar Energy
 Centrosolar
 Centrotherm Photovoltaics
 Conergy
 Gehrlicher Solar
 IBC SOLAR
 Juwi
 Meyer Burger
 Phoenix Solar
 Q-Cells
 Roth & Rau
 Singulus Technologies
 SMA Solar Technology
 SolarWorld
 Solon SE

See also 
 German Solar Industry Association
 Renewable energy in Germany
 Solar power in the European Union
 Solar power by country
 Wind power in Germany
 Geothermal power in Germany
 Renewable energy by country

References

External links 

Energy Charts – interactive graphs of German electricity production and market prices (Fraunhofer ISE)
Cloudy Germany a Powerhouse in Solar Energy, Washington Post, 2007
Southern Germany develops its PV Capacities
Cloudy Germany unlikely hotspot for solar power
Germany's sunny revolution
World's Biggest Solar Plant Goes Online in Germany
Official site about solar power and renewable Energy in the Emscher-Lippe-Region (German)